Homobasidiomycetidae is one of the two subclasses of the class Agaricomycetes which is contained in the Kingdom of Fungi.  The other subclass is Gasteromycetidae.

Agaricomycetes